Kevin Wilhelm  is an American business consultant and author in the field of sustainability and climate change. He is the CEO of Sustainable Business Consulting, a Seattle-based consulting firm focused on demonstrating the bottom-line business benefits of sustainability and leading companies through successful implementation.

He teaches sustainable business at the Bainbridge Graduate Institute in Seattle, WA, has lectured at Antioch University Seattle, Macalester College, Daniels College of Business at the University of Denver, and developed classes for City University of Seattle's Sustainable MBA Program.

He is the author of How to Talk to the "Other Side": Finding Common Ground in the Time of Coronavirus, Recession and Climate Change, Making Sustainability Stick - The Blueprint for Successful Implementation and Return on Sustainability: How Business Can Increase Profitability and Address Climate Change in an Uncertain Economy.

Background
Wilhelm graduated from Macalester College with a BA in history and began his career in professional sports as general manager of the Minnesota Thunder Pro Soccer Organization, then as a PR/Communications manager at the Seattle Sounders Pro Soccer Organization in 1998. After a brief stint as a stock coordinator at the Starbucks Coffee company, he received an MBA from the Daniels College of Business and founded Focus Solutions Consulting in Ann Arbor, Michigan before relocating to Seattle, Washington and getting a certificate in Sustainable Business from the Bainbridge Graduate Institute in 2007. In 2007 he founded Sustainable Business Consulting.

Publications
Author, How to Talk to the "Other Side": Finding Common Ground in the Time of Coronavirus, Recession and Climate Change (2020)

Author, Making Sustainability Stick: The Blueprint for Successful Implementation. (Pearson, 2014)

Author, Return on Sustainability: How Business Can Increase Profitability & Address Climate Change in an Uncertain Economy. (Pearson, 2013)

Contributing Writer, Go Green Rating Scale for Early Childhood Settings (Redleaf Press, 2010)

Contributing Writer, Green Jobs: a Guide to Eco-Friendly Employment (Adams Media, 2008)

Contributing Writer, Advancing Sustainability in Higher Education ( Jossey-Bass, 2007)

Education
B.A History, Macalester College 1995

MBA, Entrepreneurship and Venture Management, Daniels College of Business, University of Denver 2001

Certificate in Sustainable Business, Bainbridge Graduate Institute 2007

Awards
Award of Service, Excellence, Commitment: Executive Service Corps 2005
Outstanding Contribution and Leadership: Urban Options 2002

Civic leadership
2009 – Present, Faculty, Bainbridge Graduate Institute – Seattle, WA
2010 – Present, Advisor, "Go Green Seattle" – Seattle, WA
2012, Advisory Board, CORA – Bainbridge Island, WA
2005 – 2011, Chair, Seattle Chamber of Commerce- Sustainability/Clean Energy Committee
2010 – 2011, Advisor, Washington Business Alliance
2006 & 2008, Adjunct Faculty: Antioch University – Seattle, WA
2005 – 2007, Trustee, the Center for Ethical Leadership – Seattle, WA
2004 – 2007, Advisor, Executive Service Corps – Seattle, WA
2001 – 2006, Director, Reilly Foundation – Indianapolis, IN
2005 – 2006, Director: NBIS Advisory Board – Seattle, WA
2004 – 2006, Director, El Tigre Fund – Seattle, WA
2001 – 2004, Director, Earth Preservation Fund – Ann Arbor, MI
2004, Loaned Executive, Earth Share of WA – Seattle, WA
2001 – 2002, Director, Urban Options – Lansing, MI
2001 – 2002, Counselor, S.C.O.R.E – Ann Arbor, MI
1995 – 1997, Director, Club Fed – Minneapolis, MN
1995 – 1997, Director, Minnesota Thunder Youth Development Org – Minneapolis, MN

Speaking
Wilhelm has spoken to over 100+ audiences around business sustainability, including Sustainable Brands, International Society for Sustainability Professionals, Go Green Seattle, BALLE, Greater Seattle Chamber of Commerce, University of Washington, the Sierra Club, Net Impact, California College of the Arts, United for A Sustainable America.

Interviews
Sustainability and Leadership – 21st Century CEO, Sept 7, 2011, The Boss Show, 1150 KKNW AM

Walking the Sustainable Walk, Feb 1, 2010, Go Green Conference Blog 

Turning Your Business 'Green' for the "Weekday Show" May 13, 2009, KUOW

Return on Sustainability Interview, May 22, 2009, "Conversations with Liz Summers"

Questions for Kevin Wilhelm, CEO, Sustainable Business Consulting, Jun 15, 2008, Puget Sound Business Journal

References

1973 births
Living people
Sustainability advocates
American consultants
21st-century American businesspeople
Macalester College alumni
Antioch University faculty
American business writers
Pinchot University faculty